Koes Plus, formerly Koes Bersaudara (Koes Brothers), is an Indonesian musical group that enjoyed success in the 1960s and 1970s. Known as one of Indonesia's classic musical acts, the band peaked in popularity in the days far before the advent of private television companies, delivering stripped-down pop and rock songs at the then-only TV station, TVRI.

In 2007, Rolling Stone Indonesia magazine placed 6 of the band's studio albums on their 150 Greatest Indonesian Albums of All Time list. Those are Dheg Dheg Plas (1969) at number 4, To The So Called The Guilties (1967) at number 6, Koes Bersaudara (1964) at number 14, Koes Plus Volume 2 (1970) at number 21, Koes Plus Volume 4 (1971) at number 30 and Koes Plus Volume 5 (1971) at number 38.

In addition, Rolling Stone put 10 of the band's songs on the 150 Greatest Indonesian Songs of All Time list. The songs are "Bis Sekolah" (1964) at number 4, "Kembali Ke Jakarta" (1969) at number 6, "Nusantara I" (1971) at number 19, "Kolam Susu" (1973) at number 31, "Bunga Di Tepi Jalan" (1971) at number 80, "Kelelawar" (1969) at number 83, "Manis dan Sayang" (1969) at number 88, "Pelangi" (1972) at number 92, "Jemu" (1975) at number 100 and "Di Dalam Bui" (1967) at number 126.

History

Early days and controversy

Hailing from the Bojonegoro-Tuban area in East Java, the band started out as Koes Bersaudara (Koes Brothers), initially consisting of all five Koeswoyo brothers: John Koeswoyo, Yok Koeswoyo, Yon Koeswoyo, Nomo Koeswoyo and Tonny Koeswoyo. Its antics of pioneering Beatles-influenced rock and roll subculture in Indonesia proved to be controversial.  Such subcultures had been banned by President Sukarno in the early 1960s, and in 1965 the brothers were arrested by the Highest Operation Commando (KOTI) for performing covers of Beatles songs. They were eventually released just the day preceding the nation's coup d'état, on 29 September. This experience resulted in their song "Di Dalam Bui".

Koes Plus
When drummer Nomo quit in 1969, Murry was invited to fill the niche, but the decision caused an internal uproar as the band was initially projected as a family act. The feud was resolved by rebaptizing the band as Koes Plus. It consisted of the Koeswoyos plus an outsider; hence the name. Music historians have hypothesized that it was Murry's heavy drumming which led to the band incorporating rock tunes within their generally ballad-heavy albums.

Koes Plus' early days were rugged, as record companies insisted on rejecting them. Murry became frustrated at some point and temporarily quit the band, distributing their records freely as well as joining several other acts. Not until their songs were played on the state radio network did they gain considerable fame.

Present
Koes Plus never owned any legal rights pertaining to their works; they received only flat payment of approximately 3 million rupiahs for each album they recorded. While this meant that their record label was willing to produce a huge number of albums by Koes Plus due to the small investment involved, it also meant that the band never enjoyed any form of royalties whenever their works are being reproduced.

Discography

Koes Bersaudara albums

1962
 Dara Manisku;Jangan Bersedih/Dewi Rindu;Si Kancil (Irama)
 Selamat Berpisah/Selalu (Irama)
 Harapanku / Kuduslah Tjintamu (7") (Irama NP-31)

1964
 Pagi Yang Indah/Oh Kau Tahu (Irama)
 Angin Laut/Aku Rindukan Kasihmu (7") (Irama NP-33)
 Selalu / Awan Putih (7") (Irama NP-34)
 Bis Sekolah / Gadis Puri (7") (Irama NP-35)
 Aku Rindu / Sendja (7") (Irama NP-36)
 Kus Bersaudara (Dari Berpita;Untuk Ibu/Bintang Ketjil;Dipantai Bali)(Irama EP-61)
 Meraju Kalbu (Oh Kau Tahu;Pagi Yang Indah/Aku Rindu;Awan Putih)(EP)
 Angin Laut;Aku Rindukan Kasihmu/Bis Sekolah Gadis Puri (EP)
 Angin Laut (Koes Bersauadra 1962–1964) (LP) (Dara Manisku; Djangan Bersedih; Harapanku; Dewi Rindu; Bis Sekolah; Pagi Jang Indah/Si Kantjil; Oh Kau Tau; Telanga Sunji; Angin Laut; Sendja; Selamat Berpisah)(Irama LPI 17573)

1967
 To The So Called "The Guilties" (Mesra)
 Djadikan Aku Domba Mu (Mesra MP-41)
 Dara Puspita / Kus Bersaudara – Pesta Pak Lurah;Halo Halo (Dara Puspita)/Ami;Senandung Malam Hari (Kus Bersaudara) EP) Irama EPLN-2)

1977
 Koes Bersaudara Kembali (Remaco)

1986
 Koes Bersaudara 86 Lagi Lagi Kamu

1987
 Koes Bersaudara 87 Kau Datang Lagi
 Koes Bersaudara 87 Pop Jawa
 Koes Bersaudara 87 Pop Anak – Anak
 Koes Bersaudara 87 Happy Birthday
 Koes Bersaudara 87 Bossas
 Koes Bersaudara 87 Pop Batak

1988
 Koes Bersaudara 88 Country Pop

2000
 Koes Bersaudara Pop Batak Vol. 2
 Koes Bersaudara Pop Jawa

Koes Plus albums

1969
 Dheg Dheg Plas (Melody. LP-23)

1970
 Natal bersama Koes Plus (EP) (Mesra. EP-97)
 Koes Plus Volume 2 (Mesra. LP-44)

1971
 Koes Plus Volume 3 (Mesra. LP-48)

1972
 Koes Plus Volume 4 Bunga Di Tepi Jalan (Mesra. LP-50)
 Koes Plus Volume 5 (Mesra. LP-51)

 1973
 Koes Plus Volume 6 (Mesra. LP-60)
 Koes Plus Volume 7 (Mesra. LP-65)
 Koes Plus Volume 8 (Remaco. RLL-187)
 Koes Plus Volume 9 (Remaco. RLL-208)
 Christmas Song (Remaco. RLL-210)

1974
 Koes Plus Volume 10 (Remaco. RLL-209)
 Koes Plus Volume 11 (Remaco. RLL-301)
 Koes Plus Volume 12 (Remaco. RLL-302)
 Koes Plus Qasidah Volume 1 (Remaco. RLL-341)
 Natal bersama Koes Plus (LP) (Remaco. RLL-342)
 Koes Plus The Best of Koes
 Koes Plus Pop Anak-Anak Volume 1 (Remaco. RLL-306)
 Koes Plus Another Song For You (Remaco. RLL-348)
 Koes Plus Pop Melayu Volume 1 (Remaco. RLL-314)
 Koes Plus Pop Melayu Volume 2 (Remaco. RLL-347)
 Koes Plus Pop Jawa Volume 1 (Remaco. RLL-248)
 Koes Plus Pop Jawa Volume 2 (Remaco. RLL-311)
 Koes Plus Pop Keroncong Volume 1 (Remaco. RLL-299)
 Koes Plus Pop Keroncong Volume 2 (Remaco. RLL-300)
 Koes Plus Volume 8 (Instrumental) (Remaco. RLL-293)
 Koes Plus Volume 9 (Instrumental) (Remaco. RLL-294)
 Koes Plus Volume 10 (Instrumental) (Remaco. RLL-313)
 Koes Plus Volume 11 (Instrumental) (Remaco. RLL-327)
 Koes Plus The Best of Koes (Instrumental) (Remaco. RLL-320)
 Koes Plus Pop Jawa Vol 1 (Instrumental)
 Koes Plus Pop Jawa Vol 2 (Instrumental)
 Koes Plus Pop Melayu Volume 1 (Instrumental)
 Koes Plus Pop Keroncong Volume 1 (Instrumental)

1975
 Koes Plus Volume 13 (Remaco. RLL-303)
 Koes Plus Volume 14 (Remaco. RLL-631)
 Koes Plus Selalu Dihatiku (Remaco. RLL-468)
 Koes Plus Pop Anak-Anak Volume 2 (Remaco. RLL-448)
 Koes Plus Pop Melayu Volume 3 (Remaco. RLL-390)
 Koes Plus Pop Jawa Volume 3
 Koes Plus Pop Melayu Volume 2 (Instrumental)

1976
 Koes Plus in Concert (Remaco. RLL-635)
 Koes Plus History of Koes Brothers (Remaco. RLL-715)
 Koes Plus in Hard Beat Volume 1 (Remaco. RLL-717)
 Koes Plus in Hard Beat Volume 2 (Remaco. RLL-768)
 Koes Plus in Folk Song Volume 1 (Remaco. RLL-)
 Koes Plus Pop Melayu Volume 4 (Remaco. RLL-730)
 Koes Plus Pop Keroncong Volume 3 (Remaco. RLL-388)
 Koes Plus Pop Jawa Melayu (Remaco. RLL-633)
 Koes Plus Volume 12 (Instrumental)

1977
 Koes Plus Pop Jawa Volume 4

1978
 Koes Plus 78 Bersama Lagi (Purnama. PLL-2061)
 Koes Plus 78 Melati Biru (Purnama. PLL-2077)
 Koes Plus 78 Pop Melayu Cubit-Cubitan (Purnama. PLL-3055)

1979
 Koes Plus 79 Melepas Kerinduan (Purnama. PLL-323)
 Koes Plus 79 Berjumpa Lagi (Purnama. PLL-3040)
 Koes Plus 79 Aku Dan Kekasihku (Purnama. PLL-4022)
 Koes Plus 79 Pop Melayu Angin Bertiup (Purnama. PLL-4009)

1980
 Koes Plus 80 Jeritan Hati (Remaco. PLL-4044)

1981
 Koes Plus 81 Sederhana Bersamamu (Purnama. PLL-5091)
 Koes Plus 81 Asmara
 Koes Plus Medley 13 Tahun Karya Koes Plus
 Koes Plus 81 Pop Melayu Oke Boss
 Koes Plus Medley Dangdut 13 Tahun Karya Koes Plus
 Koes Plus 81 Pop Keroncong

1982
 Koes Plus 82 Koperasi Nusantara

1983
 Koes Plus 83 Da Da Da
 Koes Plus Re-Arrange I & II
 Koes Bersaudara Plus Garuda Pancasila

1984
 Koes Plus 84 Angin Senja & Geladak Hitam
 Koes Plus 84 Palapa
 Koes Plus Pop Memble 84 (Puspita Record)
 Koes Plus Album Nostalgia Platinum 1
 Koes Plus Album Nostalgia Platinum 2
 Koes Plus Album Nostalgia Platinum (Instrumental)

1985
 Koes Plus 85 Ganja Kelabu

1987
 Koes Plus 87 Cinta Di Balik Kota
 Koes Plus 87 Lembah Derita
 Milik Illahi
 Koes Plus "AIDS"

1988
 Koes Plus 88 Jumpa Pertama
 Koes Plus 88 Sakit

1989
 Koes Plus 89 Nasib

1990
 Koes Plus "Reuni"
 Koes Plus Kidung Jawa "Pit Kopat Kapit"

1991
 Koes Plus 91 Asam Di Gunung Garam Di Laut
 Koes Plus Dangdut 91 Amelinda
 Koes Plus Reggae

1993
 Koes Plus 93 Mata Bertemu Mata
 Koes Plus 93 Sedih
 Koes Plus Ultimate Collection Vol. 1 (Bravo Musik)
 Koes Plus Ultimate Collection Vol. 2 (Bravo Musik)
 Koes Plus Ultimate Collection Vol. 3 (Bravo Musik)

1994
 Koes Plus "Tak Usah Kau Sesali"

1995
 Koes Plus 95 Pantun Berkait

1996
 Koes Plus Pop Melayu Putus Cinta (Bravo Musik)
 Koes Plus Kasih 96 (Bravo Musik)
 Koes Plus House Music 96

1997
 Koes Plus Dores Rindu Kamu (Deddy Dores)

1998
 Koes Plus & Koes Bersaudara Disco House Music
 Koes Plus 98 Nusantara 2000
 Koes Plus Akustik
 Koes Plus 98 Takdir Kehidupanku

1999
 Koes Plus Pop Keroncong Abadi
 Koes Plus Burung Dara (Ian Antono)
 Koes Plus Back To Basic
 Koes Plus Love Song Koes Plus (Billy J. Budiardjo)

2006
 Melaut Bersama Koes Plus

2009
 Koes Plus Pembaharuan Song Of Porong

2011
 Koes Plus Pembaharuan "Curiga"

See also
 List of Indonesian rock bands

References

External links

 
 
 

Indonesian pop music groups
Anugerah Musik Indonesia winners
Musical groups established in 1969
1969 establishments in Indonesia